"Social Media: The Unverified Rusical" is the eighth episode of the thirteenth season of the American reality competition television series RuPaul's Drag Race, which aired on VH1 on February 19, 2021. The episode has contestants perform a musical about social media for the main challenge. Jamal Sims served as guest judge, alongside regular panelists RuPaul, Michelle Visage, and Ross Mathews. Anne Hathaway also made a guest appearance.

During the challenge, contestants are required to record their own vocals, then dance and lip-sync on the main stage as they portray various social media platforms and other aspects of the internet. Visage assisted with the vocal recording process; choreography was provided by Sims.

The runway theme was "Yellow, Gorgeous". RuPaul named Rosé the winner. Kandy Muse and Symone placed in the bottom two. After lip-syncing to "Boss" by Fifth Harmony, Symone was declared a winner but Kandy Muse was not eliminated from the competition.

Cast
 Tina Burner as Emcee and Friendster
 Rosé as Foxy (a non-social media character), who sings a parody of "Don't Rain on My Parade" from Funny Girl
 Olivia Lux as "Markie Tuckenberg", inventor of Facebook
 Symone as "Miss Instaglam" (Instagram)
 Kandy Muse as "Rev. Dr. Mrs. Linked All-the-way In" (LinkedIn)
 Elliott with 2 Ts as "Miss Toktik" (TikTok)
 Utica Queen as "Lady Tweets" (Twitter)
 Denali and Gottmik as Russian bots Natasha and Nikita

Results

Lip sync

Reception
Kate Kulzick of The A.V. Club called the Rusical "fun, if flimsy".

References

2021 American television episodes
American LGBT-related television episodes
RuPaul's Drag Race episodes
Television episodes about social media